The Special Honours Lists for Australia are announced by the Governor General at any time.

Lists
Key (see below)

Key

(This table is in sort by the Award column)

References

External links
Special Honours Lists, Governor General of Australia

Australian society-related lists